Police-General Said Soekanto Tjokrodiatmodjo (7 June 1908 – 24 August 1993) was the first Chief of the Indonesian National Police (Kapolri) and National Hero of Indonesia.

Early life 
Raden Said Soekanto Tjokrodiatmodjo was born in Bogor, West Java, the eldest of six siblings, of R. Martomihardjo, a civil servant from Ketangi Daleman, Purworejo, Central Java and Kasmirah from Ciawi, Bogor, West Java. At a few months old, Soekanto and his parents left Bogor and moved to Balaraja, Serang, after Martomihardjo was appointed as a wedana. In 1910, his family moved to Tangerang. His father's position as civil servant and wedana, had a great influence on Soekanto's life because his father had authority in the local community.

Education 

Soekanto was one of the few indigenous people who received a Dutch education. During his time at Europeesche Lagere School Bogor, Soekanto refused to be given a Dutch name, This refusal was based on an advice given by his father not to change Soekanto's name to a Dutch nickname.

While studying at Rechtshoogeschool te Batavia in 1928, Soekanto became acquainted with Jong Java and nationalists figures, Sartono and Iwa Kusumasumantri, discussing about the struggle for Indonesian independence. He was forced to leave Rechtshoogeschool te Batavia because his father had retired from the position of Wedana Tangerang.

In 1930, Soekanto was accepted as a student of Aspirant Commisaris van Politie, graduating in 1933 receiving the rank of Police Commissioner class III.

Career 

On September 29, 1945, R.S.  Soekanto was appointed by President Sukarno as the Chief of the Indonesian National Police, taking over responsibility from the Hoofd van de Dienst der Algemene Politie. Soekanto consolidated the police force to form the Indonesian National Police. 

On 15 December 1959 he was replaced by Soekarno Djojonagoro, as Chief of the Indonesian National Police. 

On 8 August 1973, During the New Order government he was appointed by President Suharto to the Supreme Advisory Council as Head of the People's Welfare Section until he was honourably discharged on 23 March 1978.

Personal life

He married Bua Hadjijah Lena Mokoginta, his schoolmate from Meer Uitgebreid Lager Onderwijs on 12 April 1932.

Soekanto died at Police Hospital on 25 August 1993. He was buried in the same grave with his wife at the Tanah Kusir TPU, Jakarta. 

On November 10, 2020, Soekanto received the title of National Hero of Indonesia by President Joko Widodo.

References

1909 births
1993 deaths
People from Bogor
Indonesian police officers
Chiefs of police
Indonesian Freemasons